Batoul Arafa (born November 16, 1981) is an Egyptian film director

Biography  
She graduated from the Mir de Dieu School in Alexandria, then joined the Higher Institute of Dramatic Arts and graduated from the Drama Department in 2005. Batoul directed a wide range of Television Drama and Theatre pieces of huge success, also directed many festivals both inside and outside of Egypt.

Filmography

Series 
 Ored Ragoln / (Arabic: أريد رجلًا)

Plays 
 Chocolate Factory  (Arabic : مصنع الشوكولاتة)  
 Cinderella  (Arabic : سندريلا)  
 The Tempest   (Arabic : العاصفة)  
 Too late  (Arabic : سوء تفاهم)  
 The Just (Arabic : العادلون)

Video Clips  
 El 3ar Series Song (Adam) 
 Deny W Denak (Tamer Hosny)
 Fe Alb Masr (Essaf)
 ElNas El Ray'ah (Ramy Ayach & Adaweya)
 Tarekh Wy Hader (Mohamed Hassan & Rawan Eleyan)
 Habibi Ya Watan (Mohamed Fouad)

References 

1981 births
Egyptian actresses
Living people
Egyptian film directors
Egyptian women film directors